Autosticha siccivora is a moth in the family Autostichidae. It was described by Edward Meyrick in 1935. It is found on Java in Indonesia.

The larvae feed on the dry leaves of Pithecolobium species.

References

Moths described in 1935
Autosticha
Moths of Indonesia